Turkish copyright law is documented in the law number 5846 on Intellectual and Artistic Works.

Turkey is revising its intellectual property rights laws in order to align them with WIPO standards. Turkey is a party to the Berne Convention, the Rome Convention and the TRIPS Agreement. Turkish copyright law was made compliant with these treaties after its 1995 and 2001 amendments.

As in all countries, a number of limitations and exceptions are codified in Turkish copyright law. These include a doctrine of exhaustion of rights after the first sale (Article 23/2), which prevents a copyright holder from controlling circulation of lawfully made copies after they have been made available to the public. It also includes a number of exceptions and limitations in Articles 31 through 38, allowing re-use of various government works (Articles 31 and 32), educational performances and collections (Articles 33 and 34), quotations of works in various circumstances (Articles 35 and 36), and incidental captures of copyrighted content in informational and news footage (Article 37). Additionally, Turkish law includes reproduction of works for personal use (Article 38).

History

The first Ottoman Empire copyright regulation was the 1850 Encumen-I Danis Nizamnamesi. The 1857 Matbaalar Nizamnamesi granted writers lifetime copyright. The 1910 Authors' Rights Act was based on mid-1800s French law or the German Copyright Code of 1901 and remained in force until 1951 though with little enforcement.

Amendments
Originally written in December 1951, law 5846 has been amended by the following laws:

 2936, 1983-11-01
 4110, 1995-06-07
 4630, 2001-02-21
 5101, 2004-03-03 (known as anti-piracy law among public)
 5217, 2004-07-14
 5571, 2006-12-28

In addition, a draft law has been prepared to amend articles 23, 25, 43, and 71–81, as part of the harmonization plan.

Related laws
Other laws applicable to the creation of audiovisual art are

 3984 (on the Establishment of Radio and Television Enterprises and their Broadcasts) 
 3257 (on Cinema, Video and Musical Works)
 5680 (Press Law)
 1117 (on the Protection of Minors against Harmful Publications)
 4054 (on the Protection of Competition)

See also
 Freedom of panorama in Turkey
 List of parties to international copyright agreements
 Copyright law of the European Union

References

External links

 Full text of law 5846 
 Full text of law 5846 

Law of Turkey
Turkish intellectual property law
Turkey